The N-138 is a highway in northern Spain which connects Estadilla to the French Border.

N-138